The Annapolis and Elk Ridge Railroad, later the Annapolis, Washington and Baltimore Railroad, once provided rail service to Annapolis, Maryland, and was one of the earliest railroads in the U.S.  It later merged into the Washington, Baltimore and Annapolis Electric Railway and was finally abandoned.  The only traces of it today are a few small sidings and utility poles that follow its former right of way.

History

Origins

In 1835, the Baltimore and Ohio Railroad (B&O) opened its Washington Branch, connecting its main line just outside Baltimore to Washington, DC. In 1836, the Maryland General Assembly voted to sponsor construction of a rail line to service the state capital in Annapolis. On March 21, 1837, a charter was granted to the Annapolis and Elk Ridge Railroad. As originally planned, instead of proceeding directly to Washington or Baltimore, the line was to start at Elkridge Landing in the western part of Anne Arundel County, now modern day eastern Howard County. There it could connect not only with the B&O but also with ships on the Patapsco River. Instead, the line started at a point named Annapolis Junction near Savage Factory, near milestone 18 on the Washington Branch.

Construction started on June 12, 1838, finishing on December 25, 1840, for $405,658.65 with, $300,000 of which came from the state. Service was inaugurated on the 26th of December 1840 at 6am out of the West Street station in Annapolis with fares of $2 to Baltimore, $2.50 to Washington, D.C., and local stations at 6¼ cents per mile. The railroad was single-tracked along most of its length and followed the drainage divide (or crest) into the Severn River on the north and the Patuxent River basin to the south. There were trestles spanning Chandlers Run and Rouges Harbor Branch and an excavation at Magazine Hill, just east of Waterbury. On 18 May 1841, a fire in the engine house at Annapolis damaged both engines, fueled by wood stored in the same building. Service was restored by July.

Elk Ridge later shortened its name to Elkridge, and the railroad did likewise, becoming the Annapolis & Elkridge Railroad. Crownsville, Millersville, and later Odenton are other present-day towns that were served by the railroad.

Civil War Involvement
During the Civil War, the railroad had strategic significance and was the scene of a minor conflict early in the war.  The Union's Massachusetts Infantry was moving south to secure Washington, D.C., but Maryland, a slave state, contained many southern sympathizers and when the troops attempted to march through the city the Baltimore riot of 1861 broke out.  Troops were subsequently shipped by ferry to Annapolis, where they attempted to use the railroad to reach Washington via Annapolis Junction. On April 21, 1861, the telegraph lines, railroad engine and many sections of track had been torn up by Marylanders dissatisfied with the outcome of the riot.  The tracks and engine were soon repaired by troops under the command of General Benjamin Franklin Butler.

Rail Expansion
The industrial era saw a major expansion of railroads into the area. The Pennsylvania Railroad-controlled Baltimore and Potomac Railroad was built in the 1870s to compete with the B&O.
 The town of Odenton (named for B&P president and Maryland governor Oden Bowie) grew up where this road crossed the Annapolis & Elkridge roughly five miles east of Annapolis Junction.

Bankruptcy
In October 1879 the Maryland Board of Public Works began to investigate why, in 40 years, the railroad had not paid any of the interest on the state's $300,000 investment.  The A&ER management blamed competition from ferry boats and high interchange tariffs charged by the Baltimore and Ohio.

In 1884 the railroad's private stockholders sued to force the sale of the railroad to recover part of their investment. The state attempted to prevent the sale, but in July 1885 the injunction they had obtained was dissolved and on November 10 of that year the Annapolis and Elkridge Railroad was sold for $100,000.

Reorganization
The railroad was reorganized on March 24, 1886, and rechartered as the Annapolis, Washington & Baltimore Railroad (AW&B) with power granted to expand to multiple locations throughout the state.

Connection Lines and Competition
While the A&ER reorganized, a new railroad, the Bay Ridge and Annapolis Railroad began operation on July 10, 1886. It connected to the AW&B at Bay Ridge Junction and connected Annapolis with the resort town of Bay Ridge, Maryland. In September of that year it was bought out by the B&O railroad.

Competition came in the form of the Annapolis & Baltimore Short Line Railroad, later the Baltimore & Annapolis Short Line Railroad, which opened in 1887.  It also served Annapolis, but provided a faster connection to Baltimore, taking a more direct path along the north shore of the Severn River. It also connected to the AW&B at Bay Ridge Junction.

Purchase and Merger
In 1902, the Washington, Baltimore and Annapolis Electric Railway began constructing a third rail line between Baltimore and Washington.  This line crossed the AW&B just east of Odenton at a place called Naval Academy Junction.  The WB&A was an electric interurban streetcar line, a new and exciting mode of transportation at the turn of the 20th century.

In 1903, the AW&B was purchased by the WB&A and reopened in 1908 as an electric interurban line. In 1921, the WB&A also acquired the Baltimore & Annapolis Short Line. After the acquisition the AW&B trackage was termed the South Shore Division, and the Short Line was called the North Shore Division.

World War I
In 1917, as the U.S. entered World War I the railroad interests in the area persuaded the U.S. Army to acquire land and open a training facility in the area roughly bounded by the B&O Washington Branch on the west, the Pennsylvania Railroad on the east, and the South Shore line of the WB&A to the south.  The installation was named Camp Meade and was supposed to be a temporary facility, used only for the duration of the war.  Fort Meade became a permanent establishment in 1928 and is still in use today.  The WB&A saw record traffic during this time as a result of freight and passenger service to the camp.  In 1918, the railroad system carried 5,946,697 paying passengers.

End of the Line
In 1931, during the Great Depression, the WB&A went into receivership. The rise of the automobile marked the end of the WB&A, along with most other electric interurbans. The system remained in operation for four more years until operation officially ceased on August 20, 1935. The WB&A was sold at public auction with scrap dealers buying most of the rolling stock. In 1935 the vast majority of the South Shore division was abandoned and sold for scrap.  The portion between Annapolis Junction and Odenton was purchased and operated by the B&O to serve Fort Meade until, sometime before 1981, it too was removed. This left only the junction tracks at Annapolis Junction—now part of an aggregates terminal.

Stations on the Line with Modern Day Related Place Names
 Annapolis Junction - connection with the B&O
 Camp Meade Junction
 Portland
 Disney (Disney Rd)
 Admiral
 Fairall
 Odenton - connection with the Pennsylvania RR (B&P)
 Naval Academy Junction - connection with the WB&A (Academy Junction Shopping Center)
 Sappington (Sappington Station Rd)
 Gambrills
 Holladay
 Millersville
 Arundel
 Waterbury (Waterbury Rd)
 Gott
 Crownsville
 Belvoir (Belvoir Manor)
 Arth
 Iglehart (Sherwood Forest)
 Woytych (Woodlore?)
 Hockley
 Best Gate
 Camp Parole
 Homewood
 Cedar Park
 Bay Ridge Junction  - connection with the Bay Ridge and Annapolis Railroad
 Annapolis at the West Street Station
 Annapolis at the U.S. Naval Academy

Surviving Landmarks
 The wye of track where the Annapolis & Elkridge joined the B&O Washington Branch (now owned by CSX) in Annapolis Junction is still intact.  It now serves a cement plant.  
 A section of railroad track exists in the Academy Junction section of Odenton, Maryland. It branches off of Amtrak's Northeast Corridor just south of MD 175/Annapolis Road and travels east past the Odenton Library and across MD 170/Piney Orchard Parkway at grade before turning north to cross Annapolis Road, also at-grade. It then travels a short distance north to the site of the old Nevamar Company's manufacturing plant. This factory was built in 1943 by then-National Plastics using the WB&A Railroad's repair buildings and tracks. That plant shut down in 2004 and trains haven't run on the spur since. Some of the former electric trolley car repair buildings remained there until the plant was cleared in 2012.
 Bridge over Dorsey Run
 The South Shore Trail, of which about 3 miles was built as of 2019, will be built on about 11 miles of the right-of-way between Odenton and Parole.
 Generals Highway was built on the right of way.
 The Poplar Trail, a half mile hike-bike rail trail in Annapolis, was built on the right of way.

References

External links

Baltimore & Ohio Railroad Museum
Modern-day photo tour of the Annapolis & Elk Ridge Railroad Right of Way

Defunct Maryland railroads